Jean-Claude Hartemann (18 December 1929 – 27 November 1993) was a 20th-century French conductor.

Biography 

Born in Vezet (Haute-Saône), a student of Jean Fournet at the École Normale de Musique de Paris, Hartemann took part to the 1956 Besançon International Competition. From 1957 to 1960, he was first conductor of the Grand Théâtre lyrique de Dijon, where he met Jésus Etcheverry, with whom he perfected his training. Regularly invited to the Opéra-Comique, he was its musical director from 1968 to 1972. A talented Mozartian, he recorded several French operettas, Gounod's St. Cecilia Mass, and created works by Franck Martin. From 1972 to 1977 he taught at the Schola Cantorum de Paris, then at the Centre culturel d'Évry. In a context of crisis in orchestral conducting in France, he is one of the very few conductors to have passed on his profession, whose lyrical repertoire was for him the essential basis.
 
Jean-Claude Hartemann died in Paris in 1993 at age 63.

References

External links 
  (discography)
 Jean-Claude Hartemann on Discogs
 Jean-Claude Hartemann on  Larousse "Dictionnaire de la musique". 
 La chanson de Fortunio directed by Jean-Claude Hartemann on 23 February 1964 (Institut National de l'Audiovisuel) 
 Gounod - St. Cecilia Mass (recording of the Century: Jean-Claude Hartemann) on YouTube

People from Haute-Saône
1929 births
1993 deaths
French male conductors (music)
20th-century French conductors (music)
20th-century French male musicians